Alicja Dąbrowska (born 1956) is a Polish politician and doctor. She held a seat in the Sejm, being elected in 2007, 2011, and 2015. In 2019 she ran but was not elected.

References

1956 births
Living people
Members of the Polish Sejm 2007–2011
Members of the Polish Sejm 2011–2015
Members of the Polish Sejm 2015–2019
Medical University of Warsaw alumni